In Australia and New Zealand, a meat pie is a hand-sized pie containing diced or minced meat and gravy, sometimes with onion, mushrooms, or cheese and often consumed as a takeaway food snack.

This variant of the standard meat pie is considered iconic. It was described by New South Wales Premier Bob Carr in 2003 as Australia's "national dish". New Zealanders regard the meat pie as a part of New Zealand cuisine, and it forms part of the New Zealand national identity.

Commercial production

Manufacturers of pies in Australia tend to be state-based, reflecting the long distances involved with interstate transport and lack of refrigeration capabilities in the early years of pie production. Many pies sold ready-to-eat at smaller outlets are sold unbranded and may be locally produced, produced by a brand-name vendor, or even imported, frozen pies heated prior to serving.

An Australian meat pie was produced in 1947 by L. T. McClure in a small bakery in Bendigo and became the famous Four'n Twenty pie. Due to its relationship with Australian rules football, Four'n Twenty has iconic status in Victoria. Other manufacturers predate this, and the pie manufacturer Sargent can trace their pie making back to 1891.

In South Australia, Balfours and Vili's have been making pies for over a century. Both of these pie makers supply pies to various venues hosting Australian rules football games.

Produced in Western Australia, Mrs Mac's Pies are sold nationwide, found mostly in service stations and corner stores, competing with other brands in the contested takeaway hotbox market on the basis of quality and fillings other than the normal fare.

In Victoria, some of the well known and famous pie makers include the makers of two of Australia's most famous pies - Four'n Twenty and Patties - both manufactured by Patties Foods in Bairnsdale.

In Tasmania, the main manufacturer of pies is National Pies. National Pies make typical beef mince pies, as well as "Cottage Pies", which are topped with mashed potato. National Pies' mince pies are rectangular in shape, as opposed to most other brands, which are round.

'Railway pies' once served on country trains and at refreshment rooms of the NSWGR, achieved a reputation for their high meat content and flavour. 

Australian meat pies were introduced into the United States in 1994 by Mark Allen, of Boort, Victoria, when he and his wife, Wendy, began operation of Pacific Products, Inc. in Marietta, Georgia. Pacific Products was a wholesale only business, selling their pies to chain retailers throughout the United States. Although Pacific Products is no longer in business, Allen and his partner Neville Steele opened the Australian Bakery Cafe in Marietta, a retail bakery which also ships its products throughout the USA.

In 1977, during the time that American fast food restaurants moved into New Zealand, Progressive Enterprises created Georgie Pie, a fast food restaurant with a menu based on meat pies. The pies were batch made and frozen at Progressive's Mangere plant.  The first Georgie Pie restaurant opened in Kelston, Auckland, and at its peak in the mid-1990s had become a chain of 32 restaurants across New Zealand.  However, after a major expansion, Georgie Pie became uneconomic to run and was eventually sold to McDonald's New Zealand in 1996. The last restaurant at Mission Bay, Auckland, closed in 1998. In June 2013, McDonald's started a trial relaunch of Georgie Pie, selling one flavour of pie (Steak Mince 'n' Cheese) through eleven of its restaurants in Auckland and Hamilton.

According to a 2003 study, the average Australian eats more than 12 meat pies each a year. According to a 2004 study, the average New Zealander eats 15 meat pies a year.

Nutritional value
The meats allowed by FSANZ to make up at least 25% of a meat pie are beef, buffalo, camel, deer, goat, hare, pig, poultry, rabbit and sheep. Kangaroo meat, a leaner alternative, is also sometimes used. However, most pie manufacturers specify 'beef' in their ingredients list; typically, those using other types of meat will simply put 'meat' in the list instead. FSANZ requires that a meat pie must contain a minimum of 25% "meat flesh". Meat flesh includes the skeletal muscle of any slaughtered animal as well as any attached animal rind, fat, connective tissue, nerve, blood and blood vessels. Offal (such as brain, heart, kidney, liver, tongue, tripe) must be specified on the label. Wild animals ("slaughtered ... in the wild state") may not be used commercially.

Awards

The Great Aussie Meat Pie Contest
Started in 1990 and held annually since, the Great Aussie Pie Contest was created to find the best everyday commercially produced meat pie produced in Australia, to promote the higher quality pie production as well as attempting to increase media attention upon the foodstuff, the iconic meat pie often dwarfed by the omnipresent advertising of fast food chains.

The contest attracts various pie-makers from all over Australia; the pies for the contest are judged anonymously to avoid bias towards or against specific bakeries or states. Run in parallel to the main contest is one for gourmet pies, with categories for such fillings as chicken, seafood and even vegetarian pies. As well as the main prize, certificates of excellence are awarded for entries that reach set quality standards. The main award is highly coveted due to the greatly increased sales it generates, with many people travelling interstate to sample the winning pie.

Bakels New Zealand Supreme Pie Awards
In New Zealand an annual pie competition has been held since 1997. The Bakels New Zealand Supreme Pie Awards aims to recognise the best pie manufacturers in New Zealand, assisting them in producing award-winning pies and continuing to help foster and encourage developments within this category of baking.

They were entered in 11 categories – mince and gravy; chicken and vegetables; gourmet meat; bacon and egg; gourmet fruit; steak, vegetable and gravy; steak and cheese; vegetarian; mince and cheese; seafood and commercial wholesale pies.  The pies were judged on presentation, the pastry on the top and bottom, the filling and the profile.

Other cultural references
In the 1970s meat pies were mentioned in an advertising jingle for General Motors Holden Australia, adapted from General Motors’ Chevrolet jingles in the United States. The jingle — football, meat pies, kangaroos and Holden cars, they go together underneath the Southern Stars.

Fair-Go Dibbler, citizen of Fourecks (The Last Continent) in Terry Pratchett's Discworld series, is famous for selling the archetypal pie floaters to his unsuspecting customers.

See also

 Steak pie
 Pie and mash
 Bierock
 List of pies, tarts and flans
 Pasty
 Pirozhki
 Pot pie
 Tourtiere
 Meat pie Western

References

External links
 The Great Aussie Meat Pie Contest
 Choice Magazine – Meat Pies
 Bye-bye American Pie, The Age, 21 July 2003

Australian pies
Australian cuisine
New Zealand cuisine
New Zealand pies
Savoury pies
National dishes
Australian rules football culture
Rugby football culture
Sports culture in Australia